Obsolete (styled °BSΩLE+e on the album cover) is the third studio album by American heavy metal band Fear Factory, released on July 28, 1998. Conceptually, it is a sequel to 1995's Demanufacture. With the success of its fourth single, "Cars", a Gary Numan cover that featured Numan himself on vocals, Obsolete would break Fear Factory into the mainstream and remain their highest selling album.

Background and recording
The group began writing and pre-production in late 1997. This came to a sudden halt when Ozzy Osbourne invited Fear Factory to open for the reunited Black Sabbath at two sold-out stadium shows at the Birmingham NEC. Fear Factory also headlined their own concert on December 7 in London. The band intended to return to work on their album in Los Angeles until late January when they would record in Vancouver with producers Rhys Fulber and Greg Reely. The working title Obsolete was announced during this time although not certain to remain.

In a first, guitarist Dino Cazares tuned down to A for this album. Gary Numan appears at the beginning of "Obsolete" and on the cover of his own 1979 song "Cars".

"Edgecrusher" is an unusual track in that during parts of the song, Olde Wolbers plays a stand-up bass, while the breakdown features hip hop scratching. The latter would prove to be a point of contention not only with purist listeners, but within the band itself: According to Herrera, Olde Wolbers' suggestion to include it was initially met by strong resistance from Cazares, as did a number of other experimental ideas.

Concept
A concept story is contained within the music and continues where Demanufacture left off. Obsolete is about the future of mankind and how machines have taken over humanity. It was inspired by the band's belief that humanity has become too reliant on technology. Bell explained, "We're up to the point in the story where man is obsolete. Man has created these machines to make his life easier, but in the long run it made him obsolete. The machines he created are now destroying him. Man is not the primary citizen on earth."

However, a hero named Edgecrusher sets out to destroy the machines and save humanity. The story of Obsolete was inspired by books like The Boys from Brazil, Brave New World, and 1984.

The CD booklet features a narrative that details one chapter in the conflict between humankind and technology which corresponds with the songs. Illustrations by artist Dave McKean, famous for his work in comic books, are also based on themes or characters from the record. Bell explained the wealth of booklet content:
"That was the only way to totally bring the concept out. When you read the words, you can visualize it in your head. The music helps to augment that. It's like a mini-graphic novel with Dave McKean artwork throughout it and a great story that goes along with the music... The challenge was to make a story out of it. It was kind of difficult to join all of these elements together. But to us, challenge is the greatest thing. Challenge makes us strive for greater ideas and concepts."

Characters

Edgecrusher
Edgecrusher is the main character and protagonist.

In the songs "Shock", "Descent", "Hi-Tech Hate", and "Resurrection", Burton C. Bell portrays Edgecrusher as the one singing the lyrics. The closer song, "Timelessness", is about him as well. As he has been captured by the Securitron in the story's conclusion, the song captures his words (or thoughts) of fear and despair as he is in jail or possibly in the process of being executed.

Securitron
The Securitron are the antagonists in the story and their name is part of the album's song, "Securitron (Police State 2000)".

Securitron is an organization that embodies the law enforcement of the machine-controlled society set in the story. They appear to be all over the world and to ensure no crime goes unseen and they have set large monitors in various places to keep humanity under their view. It is clear that a machine-controlled world state is in effect in the story but whether or not Securitron is the world state itself is unknown. This is much like how The Party in Nineteen Eighty-Four utilized the telescreens on the population of Oceania. They themselves are likely cyborgs as implied by how one of the enforcers is mentioned having gloved hands.

They come out victorious against Edgecrusher as in the end of the album they capture and imprison him.

Smasher/Devourer
Smasher/Devourer is the secondary antagonist in the story and is also the name of a song on the album.

From the description given in the album's booklet, the Smasher/Devourer is a large robot with an "egg-like frame" and "its arms are actually weaponry for protection": no further information on its design is given and what the machine really could look like is left to the imagination, but the description recalls the design of ED-209 from the RoboCop movies though the design is mostly influenced by the Terminator. It was originally created by humanity to serve as law-enforcement but was re-programmed by the Securitron.

The machine is last mentioned in the booklet's page for the song "Descent" and its status after that is unclear.

Story line

The whole plot of the album is presented in the album booklet in the form of a movie script with the lyrics intertwined in the story itself. The prologue is the following:
"2076 A.D. Everything that you believe to be true is a contradiction. Imagine a world that is suffering a slow decay, and a culture on the edge of extinction. A world in chaos brought to obedient order by the machines that man created. The linear programming that the system machine created to bring order is failing steadily due to the one variable the machines cannot compute... humanity. In this time, man has become a docile creature herded into submission under the mechanical laws that apply, programmed and desensitized for their convenience.

However, there are certain persons drawn together for reasons that are grounds for punishment, or even death. These people long and yearn for a change within the infrastructure, a better way of life, and a logical existence. These people create factions that congregate in total secrecy in places random and unknown. These factions maintain chaos in society in order to disrupt the system, locate the weak spot, and trigger a collapsing effect. Their anger is only superseded by their will to exist, and nothing could be stronger."

Scene I

The album starts off with "Shock", which is much like a declaration of the intentions of Edgecrusher. He is in the center of a dim, tungsten-lit room surrounded with people with the intent to hear what he is saying. Basically, what he says is that he will lead the opposition, the detractors of this totalitarian regime, and his aim is to destroy the current system and change it to a better one ("Shock to the system" as it is said in the lyrics), so he is going to act as a trigger for this revolution.

The next song is "Edgecrusher". In the script we find out from a newscast that the previous event took place in a prison called the MSC (Maxi-Security Containment) Facility. The reporter tells us that a breach was instigated by the Faction, but Edgecrusher caused the actual riot from inside. We are also told that he was serving a sentence for Public Disorder and Infrastructure Sabotage; then they show a clip of the breach, which is the song itself describing the break of the prisoners (hence the chorus "Break of the edgecrusher").

Before "Smasher/Devourer" the reporter details the damage and deaths caused by Edgecrusher (he must have had great strength to kill all the guards by himself or perhaps he was assisted by his cell mates) and after that we are introduced to the Smasher/Devourer character which is described in the booklet as the following: "On the monitor appears an image that looks like solid and mechanical. A bi-pedal design with an egg-shaped, armoured mainframe. What appears to be arms are actually weaponry for protection." The live coverage shows the robot's search for Edgecrusher and his companionship while the song is actually the commands of the machine to the hostile congregation ("I am the way, prepare for salvation").

"Securitron (Police State 2000)" is the last song of the first scene and the next entity to start chasing Edgecrusher. Edgecrusher is constantly watched by the monitors of Securitron so he descends underground, into the shadows below street level where apparently the refuse is, but he knows that he is safe from incident from any enforcer among the trash. The song is about the police of this dictatorial regime, the Police 2000: how oppressive they are and how they are everywhere not giving any privacy or freedom to citizens. In the end of the scene Edgecrusher is forced to surface and the scene fades out with him running down a deserted street into the night.

Scene II
The scene opens with "Descent". Edgecrusher is alone in this song, he has grown tired from running for so long from Smasher/Devourer and the Securitron. He wonders if his mission is worth it, he dwells upon his life, and what it actually amounts to. Edgecrusher stops in an abandoned building to rest himself. As he falls to sleep on a cold, flat floor, he repeats the same words as he does every night; they are the lyrics to this song. As he wakes up and looks to the sky he realizes that his life is worth the effort, so he keeps going.

Scene III
"Hi-Tech Hate" is the first song of this scene. It depicts an anti-war protest of factions of various dissensions in front of the Securitron base, a heavily guarded fortress. The lyrics are the words of a man who emerges and speaks to the crowd through a megaphone. The song is basically an anti-war, anti-nuclear proclamation from Dino Cazares.

As the man finishes, the Securitron enforcers move in on the crowd. He sees no way out of this situation: true freedom cannot be realized in a scrutinized society. He takes a can of gasoline and pours it on himself. With the match in his fingers, the lyrics of "Freedom or Fire" are his final words. This act of self-immolation is very much like Thích Quảng Đức's. "Obsolete" starts with a spoken intro by Gary Numan. They are the words of a Securitron enforcer who grabs the megaphone after the members of the crowd disperse in order to escape detainment of the enforcers. Of course, the main message of the song is that "man is obsolete" and that "our world [is] obsolete".

Having witnessed the events of these three songs, Edgecrusher begins to think how their humanity disappeared into the darkness, how mechanized they have become. As he eludes the enforcers, he enters a church and finds a statue of Jesus Christ. He has seen this image before. He apparently gains a lot of memories from seeing the statue and extends his arm to touch the face of it. In the song "Resurrection" Edgecrusher swears to continue his mission to save humanity.

The scene and album end with "Timelessness". Edgecrusher walks away from the figure and as he glances back, it seems as though it he has been weeping. The Securitron forces capture Edgecrusher in the conclusion.  This last song has a very melancholic feel to it.  The lyrics are desperate; they are Edgecrusher's words (or probably thoughts) from the jail. We can feel his fear and despair: he lost his battle against machines and failed in saving mankind.

Release
Obsolete was initially released in a standard format in July 1998. Bell explained, "We wanted the album to come as the concept and the whole story. We had the ten songs in a row for it, and "Cars" was never meant to be on the record. We just knew it would either be a single later on or a B-side or an extra track later on somewhere else. Initially it just didn't fit with the concept." Five other satisfactory songs that did not fit its story concept, including "Cars", were later included on a limited edition digipak in March 1999.

Touring and promotion
Fear Factory joined Rob Zombie and Monster Magnet for a fall 1998 tour. They also began their first headlining US tour with System of a Down, Hed PE, Static-X, and Spineshank in early 1998. The tour ran into tragedy, however, when a rental truck housing all of the band equipment and merchandise was stolen from a hotel parking lot in Philadelphia. This forced several shows to be immediately rescheduled. Three days later, the stolen truck was found near the Walt Whitman Bridge, empty and in flames.

Regarding the theft, Burton C. Bell told MTV, "January 23 was a very dark day in Fear Factory history. Our entire production was in that truck including lights, merchandise, everything. Not only was our entire production in that truck, but also the other two group's who traveled with us. System of a Down, all their stuff got taken with the truck, same with a band called SpineShank, all their equipment as well. So everything, the whole show just drove off." Such problems on Fear Factory's first headlining tour proved demoralizing; however, Bell described the events as somewhat of a "blessing in disguise" as various one-off major city dates that needed rescheduling were expanded into multiple shows heading into mid April.

In a last-minute change, Fear Factory replaced Judas Priest in the Second Stage headlining slot of Ozzfest '99. The tour ran from May through July.

Three singles were released for Obsolete. "Shock" and "Descent" managed to chart but did not endure lasting popularity. Only after the release of "Cars", exclusive to the limited edition digipack version of Obsolete, did Fear Factory gain significant mainstream exposure. This was further aided by the song's music video directed by John S. Bartley.

Charity auction
A gold record of Obsolete was provided to Allbeat.com's charity auction for Death frontman Chuck Schuldiner who was suffering from a brain tumor.  The auction faced severe controversy however; while the record sold for $1,000, the buyer never materialized. Other items up for auction, including a guitar signed by Papa Roach and articles from Crazy Town and Slipknot, also did not materialize. A new auction was to be organized, but Schuldiner died on December 13 that year.

Reception

Largely due to the popularity of the band's rendition of "Cars", which reached No. 57 on the UK charts, Obsolete gained significant commercial success. As of 2002, the album had sold over 406,000+ copies according to SoundScan. It is Fear Factory's best selling album to date and was certified gold in Australia by the ARIA and also in the US by the RIAA.

The album received positive reviews. AllMusic's Greg Prato noted, "Admirably, they've stayed true to their sound over the years, paying no mind to current musical trends - they're content with their original Ministry-meets-Slayer sound." Kerrang! (p. 61) said, "[T]he sound of Fear Factory proclaiming their supreme status to the sound of orchestral atmospherics and a title-track that sees them conversing with Gary Numan."

Covers
European death metal band Meridian Dawn recorded a version of "Descent" in tribute to the band for their debut 2014 EP The Mixtape.

Track listing
All music written by Dino Cazares, Raymond Herrera and Christian Olde Wolbers, except "Timelessness" by Burton C. Bell and Rhys Fulber.
All lyrics written by Burton C. Bell, except "Edgecrusher" by Burton C. Bell and Madchild.

Bonus tracks
A digipak version of Obsolete was released on March 23, 1999 and contains additional tracks:

Personnel

Fear Factory
Burton C. Bell – vocals
Dino Cazares – guitars
Christian Olde Wolbers – bass, upright bass (2)
Raymond Herrera – drums

Additional personnel
Rhys Fulber – keyboards and programming, strings arrangements (9, 10)
DJ Zodiac – technical scratching (2)
Pat Hoed – intro voice (2)
Gary Numan – spoken words (8), vocals (11)
Mark Ferris – strings arrangements (9, 10)

Chamber strings (tracks 9 and 10)
Chelsea Devon 
Cleo Ledingham 
Coco Collingwood 
El Feroce 
Falstaff Fallen 
Monty Washington 
Narcissa 
Pepé Lamoco 
Susie Hodge 
Walter Creery

Production
Produced by Fear Factory and Rhys Fulber; additional production by Greg Reely
Recorded by Greg Reely
Mixed by Rhys Fulber and Greg Reely
Mastered by Ted Jensen
Artwork, design and cover concept by Dave McKean
All songs published by Roadblock Music, Inc./Hatefile Music, except "Timelessness" (published by Roadblock Music, Inc./Hatefile Music and Copyright Control.

Charts

Certifications

References

Fear Factory albums
1998 albums
Concept albums
Roadrunner Records albums
Albums with cover art by Dave McKean
Albums produced by Rhys Fulber
Albums produced by Greg Reely
Nu metal albums by American artists